Catherine Rita Panton-Lewis (born 14 June 1955) is a Scottish professional golfer who was a founding member of the Ladies European Tour and won its first Order of Merit.  Her father was John Panton, MBE, a professional golfer who played on three Ryder Cup teams.

Panton was born in Bridge of Allan, Scotland. As an amateur, she won the British Ladies Amateur in 1976, winning 1-up over Alison Sheard.  Later that year, she was a member of the Great Britain & Ireland Espirito Santo Trophy team.  She was captain of the University of Edinburgh golf team in 1976 and 1977, and was Scottish Universities Champion in 1977.  She was named Scottish Sportswoman of the Year in 1976.

Panton turned professional in 1978, the same year that the Women's Professional Golf Association was founded as a division of the PGA of Great Britain and Ireland. In 1979 she participated in the first season of the Women's Professional Golf Association's tour (later the Ladies European Tour) and topped the tour's first Order of Merit. She went on to win 14 tournaments on the tour, and also played on the LPGA Tour in the mid-1980s.  She played her last full season on the LET in 1995, and has played in some events on the Legends Tour, including the inaugural Handa Cup in 2006.

Ladies European Tour wins (14)
1979 (2) Carlsberg Championship – Willingdon, State Express Tournament
1980 (1) Elizabeth Ann Classic
1981 (2) Carlsberg Championship – Queen's Park, Carlsberg Championship – Moortown
1982 (1) Moben Kitchens Classic
1983 (3) Smirnoff Ladies Irish Open, UBM Northern Classic, Dunham Forest Pro-Am
1985 (2) McEwan's Wirral Caldy Classic, Delsjö Ladies Open
1986 (1) Portuguese Ladies Open
1987 (1) Portuguese Ladies Open
1988 (1) Bowring Ladies Scottish Open

Team appearances
Amateur
Espirito Santo Trophy (representing Great Britain & Ireland): 1976
Vagliano Trophy (representing Great Britain & Ireland): 1977 (winners)
European Ladies' Team Championship (representing Scotland): 1973, 1977
Women's Home Internationals (representing Scotland): 1972, 1973, 1976, 1977, 1978

Professional
Handa Cup (representing World team): 2006

See also
List of golfers with most Ladies European Tour wins

References

External links

Scottish female golfers
Ladies European Tour golfers
LPGA Tour golfers
Winners of ladies' major amateur golf championships
Alumni of the University of Edinburgh
Alumni of the University of West London
Sportspeople from Stirling (council area)
People from Bridge of Allan
People from Sunningdale
1955 births
Living people